Nova BH is a Bosnian commercial television channel launched on 9 October 2018. From 2003 to 2018, this national commercial station formerly was known as Pink BH. Since October 2018, Nova BH is a member of the United Media portfolio, the leading media platform in South East Europe. Headquarters is located in Sarajevo and Nova BH also has offices and studios in Banja Luka.

Overview 
Nova BH aired in October 2018 and achieved extraordinary results on the media scene and positioned itself as the most watched television in the country in record time. The strategic direction of Nova BH since its founding has been to build trust with the audience with credible and timely information, and to enrich the life of the audience with entertainment and provide them with entertainment and inspiration on a daily basis.

From October 9, 2018, until today, Nova BH has ensured the broadcasting of exclusive programs to audiences in Bosnia and Herzegovina by acquiring top program titles. The entire technical, organizational and program infrastructure has been developed.

Nova BH's mission is to work with unbiased and credible information for the benefit of citizens and viewers, and enrich their lives with top-notch entertainment, providing entertainment and inspiration. Their vision is to be the most powerful and respectable TV channel in the country.

Dnevnik Newsmax Adria

Dnevnik Newsmax Adria is the main news program of Nova BH, broadcast daily at 18:15 UTC. Dnevnik Newsmax Adria is the central news program on Nova BH television, which brings citizens a cross-section of the most important events of the day. Dnevnik Newsmax Adria is under the new visual identity and license of the American media empire Newsmax. In addition to continuously raising the quality of news presentation, Dnevnik Newsmax Adria will daily bring relevant content and reports on all key events from Bosnia and Herzegovina and the world. Since its launch in 2020, the style of the broadcast hasn't changed much.

Nova IN

Nova IN brings the latest news from the domestic and foreign showbiz scene, reviews of social events and stories about the lives of celebrities to viewers' homes every day. Fashion, gastronomy, adrenaline attractions, tourism and tradition are also part of the content of this fun format. Nova IN also offers its viewers various comments, interviews and travelogues, all through several different sections hosted by journalists from the entertainment department of Nova BH.

Channel availability 
As of January 2022, Nova BH can be watched via a terrestrial signal, and Telemach, TotalTV and BH Telecom in Bosnia & Herzegovina.

In February 2020 BH Telecom, Eronet and Mtel denied the offer from United Group about how they were going to make a €0,60 fee for watching Nova BH, so they excluded it from their program schedules. In July 2021 however, BH Telecom returned Nova BH to their program schedule.

History

Pink BH (2003–2018)
In May 2003, a newly founded Pink BH began operations in Bosnia and Herzegovina.

Through the acquisition of local TV stations (RTV Kometa, NRTV Banja Luka, RTV Step, TV GLS, RTV Info Tes, TV Teodora, and TV Ljubinje), Bosnian subsidiary of Pink TV and Pink International Company also took over their terrestrial broadcasting frequencies.

With two production centers, offices and studios in Sarajevo and Banja Luka, the channel received its broadcast license for a ten-year period from the Bosnia-Herzegovina Communications Regulatory Agency (RAK) on 15 July 2005. Soon, Pink BH reach more than 80 percent of the country, covering some 63 percent of the BiH population. On 24 June 2008, the Pink Media Group opened its new headquarters in the Sarajevo neighbourhood of Alipašino polje.

Thanks to various TV content (mostly music and entertainment), Pink BH was leading television station countrywide, beating out other privately owned commercial stations and the public television stations. It was only television station that has managed to cultivate audiences in both administrative entities of Bosnia and Herzegovina (the Federation of BiH and Republika Srpska), and among all three major ethnic groups. The station also became notable for showing popular American TV series such as Charmed and Baywatch as well as Bosnian sitcoms called Sex i Selo and Mahalaši.

Most popular music and entertainment shows often were re-broadcast from Serbian RTV Pink. Later, the share of domestic production has increased by home-made TV shows like "Sarajevo On Line", "Made in Banja Luka", "Zabranjeni forum", "Sa Tanjom na ti", "Dobar komšija", "Izzy game" etc.

Thanks to regional joint production (Pink TV, Pink BH and Pink M), a popular morning program called Balkan Net was aired live from four TV studios (Belgrade in Serbia, Sarajevo and Banja Luka in Bosnia, and Budva or Podgorica in Montenegro).

Also, many international formats from Endemol Shine Group have been broadcast in co-operation with Emotion production company, for the first time in Balkan countries like Veliki Brat - Big Brother, "M(ij)enjam ženu" - local version of Wife Swap, "Ruski rulet" - Russian roulette etc.

In April 2010, it was reported that Pink BH downsized a large portion of its staff. Out of 163 employees, 57 got laid off on this occasion. The network's management said the decision had been made due to the station's decreasing revenue that went down 50% since 2008. Similarly, the once most watched station's viewership decreased in this period. In April 2014, many Bosnian and Serbian media reported that Pink TV will move all 68 cable channels from Serbia to Bosnia and Herzegovina (via PMG and Pink BH headquarters in Sarajevo) where program distribution fees were far cheaper.

In June 2018, Pink International Company (part of PMG) sold to Direct Media its Montenegrin and Bosnian divisions — Pink M and Pink BH, respectively. On 4 September 2018, PMG launched a new cable channel called Pink Media BH for Bosnian market.

On 9 October 2018, the station has been renamed to Nova BH.

Currently airing

Nationally created shows currently broadcast by Nova BH (as of January 2022)

Sports broadcasting 
Bosnia and Herzegovina national football team matches at UEFA Nations League, European Qualifiers, and friendly matches (2018–2022).

References

External links
 Nova BH's official website

Television stations in Bosnia and Herzegovina
Television networks in Bosnia and Herzegovina
Television channels and stations established in 2018
Mass media in Sarajevo